Kellie Dawn Pickler (born June 28, 1986) is an American country music singer, songwriter, and television personality. Pickler gained fame as a contestant on the fifth season of American Idol and finished in sixth place. In 2006, she signed to 19 Recordings and BNA Records as a recording artist.  Her debut album, Small Town Girl, was released later that year and has sold over 900,000 copies. The album, which was certified gold by the RIAA, produced three singles on the Billboard Hot Country Songs charts: "Red High Heels" at No. 15, "I Wonder" at No. 14, and "Things That Never Cross a Man's Mind" at No. 16.

Pickler released her self-titled second album in 2008 that produced four singles: "Don't You Know You're Beautiful" at No. 21, "Best Days of Your Life" at No. 9 (which she co-wrote with Taylor Swift), "Didn't You Know How Much I Loved You" at No. 14, and "Makin' Me Fall in Love Again" at No. 30.

In 2012, Pickler was ranked as the 14th best American Idol alumna. In October 2012, she parted ways with her former record label and signed with Black River Entertainment.

On May 21, 2013, Pickler and her partner, Derek Hough, were declared the winners of the sixteenth season of Dancing with the Stars. In 2016, she was inducted into the North Carolina Music Hall of Fame.

From 2017 to 2019, she co-hosted the nationally syndicated daytime TV talk show Pickler & Ben with comedian Ben Aaron.

Early life

Kellie Pickler was born June 28, 1986, at Stanly Memorial Hospital in Albemarle, North Carolina, to Cynthia Morton and Clyde "Bo" Raymond Pickler Jr. Her mother left when Kellie was two years old, then returned and took custody of her for two years. After this, the court returned Kellie to her grandparents when she was 12 and they raised her to adulthood because her father was absent in her life. Pickler says the major influences in her life are her grandfather, Clyde Raymond Pickler Sr., a former electrician, and grandmother, Faye Pickler. Pickler graduated in 2004 from North Stanly High School in New London, North Carolina where she was a cheerleader. She sang "On the Side of Angels" by LeAnn Rimes at her high school graduation.

American Idol
The 19-year-old Pickler auditioned for American Idol in the fall of 2005 in Greensboro, North Carolina. She sang both Kelly Clarkson's "Since U Been Gone" and Martina McBride's "A Broken Wing". The judges sent her to Hollywood. Pickler advanced through the semi-final rounds in February. On March 9, she reached the Top 12.

Pickler was among judge Simon Cowell's favorites. He once predicted Pickler would be in the final three, and said he preferred her over the previous season's winner, Carrie Underwood. Recognized for her "quirky" personality and Southern charm, Pickler gained attention on the show by saying that she had hardly ever performed before real audiences, and by mispronouncing words. She was compared to Jessica Simpson in a March 27-story in US Weekly magazine titled "Kellie: The Next Jessica Simpson", due to her "sweet Southern style and ditzy demeanor". Pickler has stated in the past a previous ignorance of common popular culture before her Idol fame.

Performances and results (during voting weeks)

Post-Idol career

After her elimination, she appeared in numerous shows promoting the TV show and performed the song "Walkin' After Midnight" in some of her appearances.

On May 6, 2006, she returned to Albemarle, North Carolina, for a parade and a reunion with her father. She received a key to the city from the mayor of Albemarle. The mayor also proclaimed the day as "Kellie Pickler Day". Pickler also received numerous awards from local and statewide government officials praising her accomplishments as a contestant on the American Idol television show.

Pickler pursued her recording aspirations in Nashville, Tennessee, shortly thereafter. On July 17, 2006, she signed a record deal with 19 Recordings/BNA Records. She later announced it herself on The View. She was part of the American Idols LIVE! Tour 2006, performing for three months in various cities. During that period, Pickler worked on her album in collaboration with top industry experts in different cities wherever the tour took her.

2006–07: Small Town Girl
Her first single, "Red High Heels", debuted on September 13, 2006, and its music video was officially released on October 20, 2006. It received a nomination for the CMT Video Awards for "Breakthrough Video of the Year".

Her debut album, Small Town Girl, released on October 31, 2006, topped Billboard's Top Country Albums and landed at number nine on the Billboard 200 selling over 79,000 copies in its first week, making Pickler the highest-selling first-week sales for a new artist in 2006. The album includes five songs that Pickler co-wrote with songwriters Chris Lindsey, Aimee Mayo, and Karyn Rochelle.

On January 18, 2007, Pickler co-hosted The View and was presented with a gold record by Rosie O'Donnell, certifying that her album has reached the 500,000 sales mark. She also performed her second single, "I Wonder", which is a personal song about her absent relationship with her mother, Cynthia Morton. It was the first performance of the song on national television.

Pickler was nominated for "Top New Female Vocalist" for the 42nd Academy of Country Music Awards.

She was also part of Brad Paisley's "Bonfires & Amplifiers" concert tour from April 2007 through October as one of the opening acts. The tour was booked in at least 37 cities across North America including a couple of stops in Canada.

Pickler appeared in country music artist Brad Paisley's music video "Online" in 2007.

In September 2007, Pickler released a version of "Santa Baby" for a Christmas country compilation. A month later, at the ASCAP Awards in Nashville, Tennessee, Pickler received a songwriter award for co-writing "Red High Heels". She performed "I Wonder", at the 2007 CMA Awards. During the performance, she was visibly overcome with emotion and struggled to even finish the song before bursting into tears. The performance received a standing ovation. She was also nominated for the Horizon Award. The performance led her to receive 3 CMT awards the following April.

2008–10: Kellie Pickler
While "Things That Never Cross a Man's Mind" was climbing the country charts (it eventually reached number sixteen), Pickler returned to the studio to record her second studio album for 19 Recordings/BNA Records. She performed the debut single, "Don't You Know You're Beautiful" at the ACM Awards on May 18, 2008, and received a good response from the audience. She was nominated for "Top New Female Vocalist", but the award went to Taylor Swift.

"Don't You Know You're Beautiful" was released to radio in June 2008 and was a Top 25 hit for Pickler, peaking eventually at number twenty-one. Her second album, Kellie Pickler, was released on September 30, 2008, and debuted at the top of the country chart, as well as number nine on the Billboard 200, selling over 43,000 copies in its first week. It matched the debuting spots of her first album, Small Town Girl.

On November 12, 2008, Pickler performed the second single from her album Best Days of Your Life at the CMA Awards. She was also nominated for "New Artist of the Year" for the second year in a row, but lost to Lady Antebellum. "Best Days of Your Life" made its radio debut in November 2008, and debuted at number 56. The song climbed very slowly up the chart, but ended up becoming Pickler's first Top 10 hit on the Hot Country Songs chart. After nearly 40 weeks on the chart, the song peaked at number nine in August 2009. A music video was made by Roman White, featuring Taylor Swift, who co-wrote and sang background harmony vocals on the song.

Pickler was nominated for "Female Video of the Year" at the 2009 CMT Music Awards for "Don't You Know You're Beautiful". She lost once again to Swift. She also presented the award for "USA Weekend Breakthrough Video of the Year" with Idol judge Randy Jackson.

Pickler accompanied Swift on the first leg of her Fearless Tour 2009. In June, she launched her first ever headline concert tour in promotion of her self-titled album. On October 8, it was announced that Pickler would be part of the second leg of Fearless Tour.

"Didn't You Know How Much I Loved You", a re-recording from Pickler's first album Small Town Girl, was released as the album's third single on August 30, 2009. The song debuted at number 55 on the U.S. Billboard Hot Country Songs chart, and became her fifth Top 20 hit, peaking at number fourteen in February 2010.

On October 26, Pickler won the title of Country Weekly's poll of most beautiful woman in country music for the second year in a row. Reba McEntire and Carrie Underwood were the second and third places, respectively.

"Makin' Me Fall in Love Again" was released as the album's fourth single on April 19, 2010. It debuted at number 53 and peaked at number 30.

2011–12: 100 Proof
It was announced that Pickler's third album would be produced by Frank Liddell, known for producing country artist Miranda Lambert's albums. "Tough" was released on June 13, 2011, as the lead-off single to Pickler's third album, 100 Proof, which was released on January 24, 2012. The album debuted at number seven on the Billboard 200 and at number two on the Top Country Albums chart. "Tough" reached a peak of number 30 on the Hot Country Songs chart, while the album's title track, which was released as the second single in April 2012, peaked at number 50 on the same chart.

On June 27, 2012, ABC News Radio reported that Pickler parted ways with Sony Nashville. Pickler's manager told ABC News Radio, "Kellie's contract with Sony came to an end and they mutually decided not to renew it".
On July 10, 2012, she sang "God Bless America" during the seventh inning stretch at the 2012 Major League Baseball All-Star Game.
On October 8, 2012, CMT reported Pickler had signed with the independent record label Black River Entertainment.

2013–present: The Woman I Am
Pickler's first single with Black River Entertainment, "Someone Somewhere Tonight," was released on May 14, 2013. After eight weeks, it reached a peak of number 49 on the Billboard Country Airplay chart in July 2013, and served as the lead-off single to Pickler's fourth album, The Woman I Am, which was released on November 11, 2013. Pickler wrote the title track with her husband, songwriter Kyle Jacobs.

"Little Bit Gypsy" and "Closer to Nowhere" were released as the album's second and third singles and reached peaks of number 50 and number 59 on the Country Airplay chart, respectively. A promotional single, "Feeling Tonight," was made available as a digital download on June 2, 2015, but never received an official radio release. It was later announced in June 2016, that Pickler had parted ways with Black River.

Dancing with the Stars
On May 21, 2013, Pickler and Derek Hough were announced the winners of the sixteenth season of Dancing with the Stars. She performed a well received super sized freestyle, which scored a perfect 30 and garnered effusive praise from the dance judges. She performed "Little Bit Gypsy" on November 25, 2013, episode in the seventeenth season.

VeggieTales
In 2013, Pickler starred as Mirabelle in the fiftieth VeggieTales video, "Beauty and the Beet" released on October 14, 2014.

Personal life
Pickler's parents split up the day after her second birthday; a year later, in July 1989, her mother vanished. In 1992, Pickler's mother returned to Albemarle, but rarely made contact with her. But in March 1995, with Bo Pickler in prison for armed robbery, her mother was granted custody. Pickler was in the fourth grade. In a February 2006 interview with the Charlotte Observer, Pickler said: "She got custody of me for two years... During that time, she was physically and mentally abusive of me." In a 1997 court filing, Pickler's grandparents said that her mother had moved to Union County with her and treated her harshly. The court restored custody to the grandparents. Her mother vanished again, and Pickler has not heard from her since. Her father, whom she describes as an alcoholic and drug addict, served a three-year-nine-month prison sentence at Florida State Prison for aggravated assault and battery stemming from a 2003 stabbing incident. He was released on May 6, 2006, a week after her elimination from Idol. In an April 2006 interview with NBC Pickler said, "One thing that's so important in life is we learn to forgive others. I ask the Lord every day to forgive me for my sins and for things that I've done wrong. And who am I to not forgive someone for what they've done?" ..."God tells us to love everyone."

On February 26, 2007, she met her personal "idol" and strongest influence, Dolly Parton. The surprise was arranged by Sony BMG Nashville chairman Joe Galante.

In 2007, Pickler was in a relationship with Nashville Predators player Jordin Tootoo and visited his family in Nunavut. Later that year, the two broke up.

Pickler's best friend is Summer Miller, whom Pickler met when they were teen pageant hopefuls.
Pickler is close friends with Carrie Underwood; Taylor Swift, who co-wrote Pickler's second single "Best Days of Your Life" from her album Kellie Pickler; and her American Idol roommate, Katharine McPhee she was a bridesmaid at McPhee's 2008 wedding.

In June 2008, she joined Carrie Underwood, a vegetarian since childhood, in giving up eating meat. Pickler stated that she initially decided to go vegetarian for health reasons, but a television advertisement that vegetarian Pamela Anderson did for animal rights group PETA piqued her curiosity. "One night I couldn't sleep and I was up and just Googling random stuff and I'm like, 'Hmmm, PETA.' I saw all the videos and I just thought it was horrible. It's animal cruelty. A lot of it has to do with knowing what happens to the animals and it really bothered me and so I will not eat meat." In May 2009, it was announced that Pickler was nominated for, and won, the title of "World's Sexiest Vegetarian" by PETA.

After two and a half years of dating, Pickler became engaged to songwriter Kyle Jacobs on June 15, 2010, her late grandmother's birthday, after he proposed on a beach at sunset. For a background piece on Dancing with the Stars, Pickler related that the couple had planned an elaborate ceremony, but as the date approached, "I looked at him and said, 'Baby, this ain't us.'" On January 1, 2011, she and Jacobs eloped and married in a "small, intimate ceremony on a private island in the Caribbean".

On September 4, 2012, Pickler shaved her head on Good Morning America in support of her friend, Summer Holt Miller, who started chemotherapy after breast surgery.

In 2015, it was announced that Pickler and Jacobs would star in a 13-episode reality show for CMT entitled I Love Kellie Pickler. The show premiered on November 5, 2015.

On February 17, 2023, Jacobs died by a self-inflicted gunshot wound in Nashville, Tennessee at the age of 49.

Philanthropy

Pickler actively supports St. Jude Children's Research Hospital, where she helps raise funds and gives kids special visits. She also participates in charitable events to help raise funds for various organizations. She has performed to help raise funds for the "N.C. Children's PROMISE" to benefit the Children's Hospital on November 12, 2006, to help refurbish the Hurricane Katrina-damaged NFL Youth Education Towns Boys & Girls Club of New Orleans on December 16, 2006, visited St. Jude Children's Research Hospital on January 12, 2007, and visited Pennington Elementary School on February 1, 2007. "When you're able to give back to your communities and organizations like St. Jude, it's a great thing," Pickler said. "It's been a great experience, and I encourage anyone and everyone to help."

Pickler participated with other country artists in an online auction for charity by Mario Magro: Kiss for a Cause Foundation Celebrity Auction held June 15–25, 2007, in support of orphaned and abandoned children. The event auctioned off celebrity lip prints and signatures pressed on the inside of Mario Magro Crystal Le Coop handbags at the 42nd Annual Academy of Country Music Awards. In November 2007, Pickler appeared on a celebrity edition of the quiz show Are You Smarter Than a 5th Grader?, playing for the charities of her choice, (American Red Cross and the AARP's Grandparenting Program). During the show, she was asked to name the European country for which Budapest is the capital, to which she responded "...I thought Europe was a country ...I know they speak French there. Is France a country?"  She chose the copy cheat, allowing her to go along with the 3rd grader's correct response of Hungary.

Pickler has participated in three tours on behalf of United Service Organizations. The first, in late 2007 and early 2008, took her to Iraq; the second, in December 2008, included stops in Germany, Afghanistan, Iraq, Kosovo, and England. In January 2010, Pickler made stops in Iraq and Kuwait on a 10-day tour with Randy Houser and Jamey Johnson. The three country stars "played remote bases on the front lines of the war zone, and the sound of gun fire became their frequent companion at night."

In early August 2009, Pickler participated in ABC's Extreme Makeover: Home Edition'''s rebuilding of James Terpenning's family home in Beavercreek, Ohio. Pickler performed a free concert at the home, and helped during reconstruction.

On June 26, 2016, on an episode of Celebrity Family Feud, Pickler and her team won $25,000 for her charity, USO.

Dancing with the Stars performances

Discography

 Small Town Girl (2006)
 Kellie Pickler (2008)
 100 Proof (2012)
 The Woman I Am (2013)

Tours
 Still Feels Good Tour (2007) with Rascal Flatts
 Bonfires & Amplifiers Tour (2007–08) with Brad Paisley
 Love on the Inside Tour (2008) with Sugarland
 Fearless Tour (2009–10) with Taylor Swift
 American Living Unstoppable Tour (2010) with Rascal Flatts
 Nothing Like This Tour'' (2010) with Rascal Flatts

Television work

References

External links

 
 
 

1986 births
19 Recordings artists
21st-century American singers
21st-century American women singers
Actresses from North Carolina
American beauty pageant winners
American country singer-songwriters
American women country singers
American Idol participants
Beauty pageant contestants from North Carolina
Black River Entertainment artists
BNA Records artists
Country musicians from North Carolina
Dancing with the Stars (American TV series) winners
Living people
People from Albemarle, North Carolina
Singer-songwriters from North Carolina
United Service Organizations entertainers